The Canton of Savines-le-Lac is a former canton in the Arrondissement of Gap in the department of Hautes-Alpes in the region Provence-Alpes-Côte d'Azur in France. It was disbanded following the French canton reorganisation which came into effect in March 2015. It consisted of 6 communes, which joined the canton of Chorges in 2015. It had 1,943 inhabitants (2012). Its main town and commune was Savines-le-Lac and its last representative in the conseil général  was Victor Berengue.

Communes 
It consisted of the following communes:
 Puy-Saint-Eusèbe
 Puy-Sanières
 Réallon
 Saint-Apollinaire
 Le Sauze-du-Lac
 Savines-le-Lac

See also
Cantons of the Hautes-Alpes department

References

Former cantons of Hautes-Alpes
2015 disestablishments in France
States and territories disestablished in 2015